Stephen Capon (25 April 1927 – 3 March 2017) was an English cricketer who made one first-class cricket appearance for Kent County Cricket Club in 1950. Capon batted right-handed and bowled right-arm fast-medium pace. He was born at Snodland in Kent.

Capon made his only appearance for the Kent First XI in the 1950 County Championship against Nottinghamshire at Trent Bridge. He played seven times for Kent's Second XI in the Minor Counties Championship between 1950 and 1955.

He died at Bristol in March 2017 aged 89.

References

External links

1927 births
People from Snodland
English cricketers
Kent cricketers
2017 deaths